Fabien Morel  (born 22 January 1965, in Reims) is a French algebraic geometer and key developer of A¹ homotopy theory with Vladimir Voevodsky. Among his accomplishments is the proof of the Friedlander conjecture, and the proof of the complex case of the Milnor conjecture stated in Milnor's 1983 paper 'On the homology of Lie groups made discrete'. This result was presented at the Second Abel Conference, held in January–February 2012.

In 2006 he was an invited speaker with talk A1-algebraic topology at the International Congress of Mathematicians in Madrid.

Selected publications
 A1-algebraic topology over a field. (= Lecture Notes in Mathematics. 2052). Springer, 2012, .
 with Marc Levine: Algebraic Cobordism. Springer, 2007, .
 Homotopy theory of Schemes. American Mathematical Society, 2006 (French original published by Société Mathématique de France 1999)

References

1965 births
Living people
Scientists from Reims
20th-century French mathematicians
21st-century French mathematicians
Algebraic geometers